The following elections occurred in the year 1894.

 1894 Brazilian presidential election
 1894 Peruvian presidential election

North America

Canada
 1894 British Columbia general election
 1894 Edmonton municipal election
 1894 Northwest Territories general election
 1894 Ontario prohibition plebiscite
 1894 Ontario general election

United States
 United States House of Representatives elections in California, 1894
 1894 New York state election
 United States House of Representatives elections in South Carolina, 1894
 1894 South Carolina gubernatorial election
 1894 United States House of Representatives elections
 1894 and 1895 United States Senate elections

Europe
 1894 Belgian general election 
 1894 Dutch general election
 1894 Norwegian parliamentary election
 1894 Portuguese legislative election

United Kingdom
 1894 Forfarshire by-election

Oceania

New Zealand
 1894 Waitemata by-election

See also
 :Category:1894 elections

1894
Elections